Ali Baldiwala is an actor who is best known for his role as Mansoor in the Bollywood biopic Neerja. He is also an Interior Designer.

Personal life 
Baldiwala was born in Mumbai and has lived his entire life there. He went to G.D. Somani School and completed his undergraduate education from H.R. College of Commerce and Economics. He then studied Interior Designing at Rachana Art Institute.

Career 
Baldiwala says he had the passion to act since childhood. He started his Interior Designing career after studying but never really got the chance to pursue acting back then. He was offered the role of a hijacker (Mansoor) in director Ram Madhvani's Neerja in 2015. Neerja was his debut film. His character Mansoor was often referred to as the 'Hijacker with a Soul.' 

Baldiwala has also done an ad film for Appy Fizz with actor Saif Ali Khan.

After Neerja, Baldiwala has said in an interview he does not intend on doing any more negative roles.

References

Indian male film actors
Indian interior designers
Living people
Year of birth missing (living people)